Carlos Silva Anguita (16 August 1926) was a Chilean sprinter. He competed in the men's 100 metres at the 1948 Summer Olympics.

References

External links
 

1926 births
Year of death missing
Athletes (track and field) at the 1948 Summer Olympics
Chilean male sprinters
Olympic athletes of Chile
Place of birth missing
20th-century Chilean people